Stuckenberg is a surname. Notable people with the surname include:

Brian Roy Stuckenberg (1930–2009), South African entomologist
Fritz Stuckenberg (1881–1944), German painter
Viggo Stuckenberg (1863–1905), Danish poet

Danish-language surnames